Voluntary Health Services, popularly known as the VHS Hospital, is a multispecialty tertiary care referral hospital in the south Indian state of Tamil Nadu, reportedly serving the economically weaker sections of the society. It was founded in 1958 by Krishnaswami Srinivas Sanjivi, an Indian physician, social worker and a winner of Padma Shri and Padma Bhushan awards and is run by a charitable non governmental organization of the same name. The hospital is situated along Rajiv Gandhi Salai at Taramani, in Chennai.

History
Srinivas Sanjivi, a senior official with the Madras Medical Service, resigned from the government service in 1958 and with the assistance of some of the prominent social leaders in Chennai such as Kasturi Srinivasan, T. R. Venkatarama Sastri, M. Bhaktavatsalam, and M. A. Chidambaram, he registered a charitable trust under the name, Voluntary Health Services, in July for serving the economically weaker sections of the society. The foundation stone of the hospital building was laid by Jawaharlal Nehru, then prime minister of India in October 1961 and the hospital became functional in July 1963.

Multi-country South Asia DIVA Project
VHS under the Global Fund Round 9 programme implemented the project titled “DIVA” in India (except North East) with the support of UNDP-APRC (Phase 1) and Save the Children International, Nepal (Phase 2). The project under the guidance of National AIDS Control Organisation (NACO) and in partnership with respective State AIDS Control Societies (SACS) aims to reduce the impact of HIV on Hijra (H)/Transgender (TG) population.  The major activities of DIVA project include sensitisation, capacity building, advocacy programmes and research activities. A transgender community resource directory is available online that contains more information pertaining to transgender people across India.

Facilities
The hospital is a tertiary care referral hospital with facility for treating 465 inpatients and has seven major specialties such as General Surgery, Neurology, Ophthalmology, Neurosurgery, Diabetic clinic, Obstetrics and gynecology and Psychiatry and Drug rehabilitation. The neurology department was started in 1965 and handles clinical psychology, physiotherapy, epilepsy, special needs treatment and dietetics. Gynaecology department started as an outpatient wing in 1965 with ante and post natal care. In 1991, obstetric and infertility clinics were also added for attending to high risk deliveries. The neurosurgical centre, named Dr. A. Lakshmipathi Neurosurgical Centre, was started by the renowned neurosurgeon, Balasubramaniam Ramamurthi, in 1978. It has grown to be a tertiary level referral centre and has facility for treating complicated cranial and spinal disorders.

The general surgery department attends to gastrointestinal, thoracic and abdominal surgeries such as hernia, thyroid issues, appendectomy as well as invasive procedures such as colonoscopy and endoscopy. The hospital has a well-equipped ophthalmology section for the treatment of glaucoma, retinal diseases and macular disorders and carries out vitreo-retinal and cataract surgeries. The Department of Psychiatry, named Rajaji Centre for De-Addiction, has 22 beds and apart from outpatient services, short-term in-patient services for de-addiction treatment are also provided. VHS has been operating a blood bank since 1963 where only voluntary blood donation is accepted.

The Institute of Neurological Sciences
The Institute of Neurological Sciences (TINS) at VHS, was established by Prof. Krishnamoorthy Srinivas in year 1965. Over 50 years TINS has expanded into a hub for community-based professional training, academic courses, internship trainings for post graduate candidates (social work and psychology) providing exposure to neuroscience research and expert clinical neurology. The Department offers Fellowship in Neuropsychiatry  and Doctoral Program in Neuropsychiatry, Neurology and Clinical Neurosciences. The coursework is affiliated to the Tamil Nadu Dr. M.G.R. Medical University.

TINS was one of the global project-site of 10/66 Dementia Project with E. S. Krishnamoorthy as principal investigator. E. S Krishnamoorthy and Vivek Misra have also been instrumental in establishing the M.A.T.C.H Project (Maximising Through Comprehensive Healthcare), a community-based healthcare program having Pediatrics and Geriatrics arm focusing upon mental health in community population. The project was funded by Dr. Deepa Krishnan Foundation and B.N.P. Paribas Sundram Finance.

Social initiatives
VHS has been providing free medical care to around 70 percent of its patients since its inception. The eligibility for free medical aid is fixed at a certain earning level of the patients or their families and include medicines, stay and food. It runs a primary health care network of 14 mini health centres in the state of Tamil Nadu under the banner, M.A.Chidambaram Institute of Community Health. The program is managed in close association with the Indian Council of Medical Research and UNICEF. The health centres serve around 100,000 people in small towns and villages of Tamil Nadu with regard to immunization, maternity care, family welfare, sanitation and hygiene, school health examination, and maintenance of birth and death records. The project also covers a medical aid plan, a form of insurance scheme for the lower and middle-income families.

VHS has been recognised by the United States Agency for International Development (USAID) as its partner in the USAID funded  4.98 million project, South to South HIV/AIDS Resource Exchange (SHARE). Chartered, a division of VHS manages the Share project. The AIDS Prevention and Control (APAC) is another USAID joint venture VHS is engaged in. Under the purview of the project, VHS oversees the prevention and control programs for Sexually transmitted diseases, HIV, and AIDS. The project started in Tamil Nadu in 1995 and was later extended to Puducherry in 2002. The Tamilnadu AIDS Initiative (TAI) is a program the hospital has instituted under the umbrella, Avahan – India AIDS Initiative, a Bill and Melinda Gates Foundation project. VHS is also a partner in the Solidarity and Action Against The HIV Infection in India (SAATHI) initiative, a non governmental collaborative program for fighting AIDS in India.

Revathi Raj, a paediatric haematologist has established the Thalassaemia Welfare Association in VHS with assistance from TTK Foundation and Rotary Club Madras. The centre provides patients afflicted with thalassemia with free blood transfusions, iron chelation therapy and consultative care. The association has schemes for information dissemination on the disease and plans to conduct regular blood checks at Colleges in Chennai.

Honouring the founder
Voluntary Health Services honours its founder, K. S. Sanjivi, with an annual lecture, K. S. Sanjivi Endowment Lecture, since 1995, Aruna Roy, Vishwa Mohan Katoch and Ravi Narayan being some of the notable personalities who have delivered the lecture in the past. The auditorium at VHS is also named after him.

Notable Physicians
 B. K. Misra
 Balasubramaniam Ramamurthi 
 Ennapadam Srinivas Krishnamoorthy

See also

 Healthcare in Chennai
 United States Agency for International Development
 Kasturi Srinivasan
 T. R. Venkatarama Sastri
 M. Bhaktavatsalam
 M. A. Chidambaram
 Krishnaswami Srinivas Sanjivi
 Avahan

References

External links
 [www.vhsdiva.org Transgender community resource directory containing information pertaining to transgender people across India]
 

Hospitals in Chennai
Charitable hospitals
1958 establishments in Madras State
Hospitals established in 1958